51st State is a 2010 post-apocalyptic themed card-driven strategy board game published by Polish company Portal Games and designed by Ignacy Trzewiczek. The game received several expansions and a second edition, 51st State: Master Set, in 2016.

References

External links 

 
 

Board games introduced in 2010
Polish board games
Post-apocalyptic games
Polish card games
Card games introduced in 2010
Science fiction board games